Novoselyshche is an inhabited locality in Ukraine and it may refer to:

 Novoselyshche, Zolochiv Raion, a village in Zolochiv Raion, Lviv Oblast
 Novoselyshche, Zaporizhzhia Raion, a village in Zaporizhzhia Raion, Zaporizhzhia Oblast